Tabani's School of Accountancy (abbreviated as: TSA) is  a privately owned tertiary institution which provides professional chartered accountancy education in Karachi, Pakistan. The school has three campuses throughout Karachi, with over 4,000 students studying at three differentiated campuses located at P.E.C.H.S, North Nazimabad and Clifton.

History

TSA offers tuition for professional chartered accountancy qualifications through the following academic departments, each specializing in certain areas of study.

TSA has two subsidiaries; "Tabani's College" previous known as "Institute of Business Education (IBE)" and "Tabani’s Academy of Cambridge".

See also
 Institute of Chartered Accountants of Pakistan
 List of accounting schools in Pakistan

References

External links
 Official Facebook Page
 Official website

Accounting schools in Pakistan
Educational institutions established in 1998
1998 establishments in Pakistan